Edmonton/Twin Island Airpark , also known as Twin Island Air Park, is located  southeast of Edmonton, Alberta, Canada.

See also
List of airports in the Edmonton Metropolitan Region

References

Registered aerodromes in Alberta
Aviation in Edmonton
Transport in Strathcona County